Barthélemy Diedhiou (born 2 January 2001) is a Senegalese footballer who plays as a winger or forward for French club Lille B.

Career

In 2021, Diedhiou was sent on loan to Portuguese second division side Trofense from Lille in the French Ligue 1. On 12 September 2021, he debuted for Trofense during a 0-0 draw with Casa Pia.

References

External links
 

2001 births
Living people
Senegalese footballers
Association football forwards
Association football wingers
Lille OSC players
C.D. Trofense players
Championnat National 2 players
Championnat National 3 players
Liga Portugal 2 players
Senegalese expatriate footballers
Expatriate footballers in Portugal
Senegalese expatriate sportspeople in Portugal
Expatriate footballers in France
Senegalese expatriate sportspeople in France